The Republic of the Congo national basketball team is the men's basketball side that represent the Republic of the Congo in international competition. They have appeared in the FIBA Africa Championship, but have yet to appear in the FIBA World Championship.

Serge Ibaka is the country's most famous player. Yet, he opted to represent Spain internationally since he had lived there for several years.

Competitive record

Summer Olympics
yet to qualify

FIBA World Championship
yet to qualify

FIBA Africa Championship

African Games

1965 : 
1973-2011 : Did not qualify
2015 : 6th
2019 : To be determined

Roster
Team for the 2015 Afrobasket Qualification:

Notable players
Other current notable players from Republic of the Congo:

Past rosters
Team for the 2013 FIBA Africa Championship.

Kit

Manufacturer
Spalding

See also
Republic of the Congo national under-19 basketball team
Republic of the Congo national under-17 basketball team
Republic of the Congo women's national basketball team
Republic of the Congo national 3x3 team

External links
FIBA Profile
Congo Basketball Records at FIBA Archive

References

Congo
Basketball
Basketball teams in the Republic of the Congo
Basketball
1962 establishments in the Republic of the Congo